Anarestan Rural District may refer to:

Anarestan Rural District (Bushehr Province)
Anarestan Rural District (Fars Province)